Angram is a hamlet in the Yorkshire Dales in the Richmondshire district of North Yorkshire, England. It is situated near to Keld to the north and Thwaite to the south. Angram forms part of the civil parish of Muker.

Governance
The hamlet is within the Richmond (Yorks) parliamentary constituency, which is under the control of the Conservative Party. The current Member of Parliament, since the 2015 general election, is Rishi Sunak.

Angram also falls within the Hawes, High Abbotside and Upper Swaledale ward of Richmondshire District Council and the Upper Dales Electoral Division of North Yorkshire County Council.

Geography
The hamlet is located on the B6270 between Thwaite and Keld below Great Shunner Fell and close to a small beck named Skeb Skeugh.  The area around this beck, known as Angram Bottoms, has been designated a Site of Special Scientific Interest (SSSI). It is made of seven fields covering 24.2 acres supporting a diverse habitat of flora. A combination of mire and wet grassland, due to many sinkholes and springs. Plants in the wet grasslands that can be found here include sharp-flowered rush, lesser spearwort, slender tufted-sedge, bottle sedge, common marsh-bedstraw, northern marsh-orchid, marsh-marigold and meadowsweet. Other areas of marsh support marsh lousewort, carnation sedge, flea sedge, star sedge, marsh valerian and marsh violet.

References

External links 
 Angram in the Upper Dales website

Hamlets in North Yorkshire
Swaledale